The Vivekananda Yuba Bharati Krirangan (VYBK), commonly known as the Salt Lake Stadium, is an all-seater multi-purpose stadium located in Bidhannagar, with current capacity of 85,000 spectators. Named after Swami Vivekananda, the stadium is the home ground for multiple football clubs, most notably ATK Mohun Bagan, East Bengal and Mohammedan. It is the fifth largest sports stadium in Asia by seating capacity. Before its renovation in 2011, it was the largest football stadium in the world, having a seating capacity of 120,000. Prior to the construction and opening of Rungrado May Day Stadium in 1989, it was the largest football stadium in the world. The stadium hosted the final match of the 2017 FIFA U-17 World Cup, alongside hosting other matches of the tournament. As part of security measures for the 2017 U-17 World Cup, the stadium was only open for 66,687 viewers.

The stadium's record attendance was recorded in 1997 when 131,781 spectators watched the Federation Cup semifinal between East Bengal and Mohun Bagan.

The stadium switched back to natural grass from artificial turf as part of the preparations for hosting the U-17 World Cup in 2017. The new turf was unveiled in a Kolkata Derby match between East Bengal and Mohun Bagan during the 2015–16 Calcutta Premier Division match.

About
The stadium was established in 1984 because the club grounds in the Maidan area, each with capacity around 20,000, were proving too small for the huge crowd that occupied the grounds on matchdays. And while the Eden Gardens was there to handle some of the bigger games, like the Kolkata Derby, the pressure of handling both cricket and football was proving to be a bit too much for the stadium.

The stadium is situated approximately 10 kilometres to the east of the Kolkata downtown. The roof is made of metal tubes and aluminum sheets and concrete. The stadium was inaugurated in January 1984. There are two electronic scoreboards and control rooms. There is illumination at night . There are special arrangements for TV broadcasting.

The gigantic stadium features three tiers of concrete galleries. The stadium has 9 entry gates and 30 ramps for the spectators to reach the viewing blocks. The nine gates include the VIP gate. The gates 1 and 2 are on Kadapara road, gate no.3, 3A, 4, 4A and 4B are on the side of Broadway; gate no 5 and the VIP gate are on the side of EM By pass. The ramps are inside the stadium and link the inner ring road to the different levels of the stadium complex.

The stadium has a unique synthetic track for athletic meets. It also houses electronics scoreboards, elevators, VIP enclosures, peripheral floodlighting arrangement from the roof-top, air-conditioned VIP rest room, conference hall and much more. The stadium has its own water arrangements and standby diesel generation sets.

Renovation
The  renovation project started in February 2015. The artificial turf at the stadium has been replaced by an all-natural grass pitch. The new grass is from Riviera Bermuda seeds procured from the United States and below it there are two layers of sand and gravel. The next layer is fitted with perforated pipes to prevent water-logging.

German company Porplastic provided the elastic coating for the running track around the pitch which was replaced for the first time since the stadium was built in 1984. The old track has been scooped out and the new surface was laid.

The lobby of the VIP entrance that leads to the player's arena, was air-conditioned. The broadcast rooms and stadium offices were renovated.

Bucket seats replaced the concrete benches in the galleries, which brought down the stadium's capacity from 120,000 to 85,000.

The VIP and press boxes, both in the middle tier, were pulled down and a new press box with a capacity of 240 seats is now on the third tier. The VIP box remained on the second tier, with an added 240 seats. The press conference room that used to be cramped during derbies and matches featuring international teams has been shifted to a 19 x 8.5-metre space under a gallery. A spacious broadcast room of similar dimensions has been 
built as well.

Two full-sized practice grounds with perforations on the surface for underground drainage and eight floodlight towers have come up at the Hyatt end of the stadium, as recommended by FIFA. The same imported Riviera Bermuda grass used on the main turf will cover the practice grounds. The drainage network has been designed to ensure that the surface never becomes slushy. The referees rooms have been built alongside the practice grounds.

The number of gates to the stadium has been increased from seven to nine. Some of the existing gates has been widened too, as are the approaches that connect the entrances and exits to the ring road. Each link road is 21 meters wide. The surroundings has been beautified by the forest department.

To the left of the lobby, rooms have been constructed for referees and ball boys.

Location
The stadium is located in the satellite township of Salt Lake in North 24 Parganas and it also lies beside the Eastern Metropolitan Bypass which makes it easily accessible by road.

Transportation 
There are numerous buses which ply around the city to the stadium. The Line 2 of the Kolkata Metro  is passing near the stadium, therefore the stadium has its own station, opened on 13 February 2020 .

Football matches

After its inauguration in January, 1984 with the Jawaharlal Nehru International Gold Cup, the Salt Lake Stadium has hosted several important international tournaments and matches such as matches of the 1986 FIFA World Cup qualification in 1985, Super-Soccers in 1986, 1989, 1991 and 1994, 3rd South Asian Games in 1987, USSR Festival Cup in 1988, Charminar Challenger Trophy in 1992 and the Jawaharlal Nehru International Gold Cup in 1995.

The Salt Lake Stadium hosts the home games of the local clubs Mohun Bagan and East Bengal who played in the I-League and now plays in the ISL as ATK Mohun Bagan and East Bengal, respectively. It also hosts the games of Mohammedan, who currently play in the 2nd Division I-League. Many of the home games of the Indian Team are also played in the Salt Lake Stadium. Since 2014 a new tenant team Atlético de Kolkata (playing in the ISL) has made the stadium their home ground. Later ATK merged with Mohun Bagan in 2020 and became ATK Mohun Bagan.

On June 5, 2011, FIFA scheduled a friendly match  to be played at the Salt Lake on 2 September 2011. The match was played between Argentina and Venezuela. This was a historic occasion in the history of Indian football and also for the stadium as the match featured Argentine superstar Lionel Messi.
 
The stadium has also hosted Oliver Kahn's official farewell match for Bayern Munich when they played a friendly match against Mohun Bagan. Bayern Munich won the match 3–0.
In December 2012, a friendly match was played between Brazil Masters and IFA All Stars. Brazil Masters won it 3–1. Beto scored twice and Bebeto scored one goal for Brazil Masters.

On 12 October 2014, the stadium hosted the first match in the Indian Super League, preceded by an opening ceremony which featured superstars from the footballing world as well as from Bollywood. In the opening match, Atlético de Kolkata defeated Mumbai City FC 3–0. The stadium hosted its last match of the inaugural edition of ISL on 14 December where Atlético de Kolkata played FC Goa in the first leg of the semi-finals. Salt Lake stadium was the only stadium among the eight venues of ISL where matches were allowed to be played on artificial turf. It hosted 11 matches in 2017 FIFA U-17 World Cup, including the Final. The stadium also hosted the FIFA world cup qualification match between Bangladesh and India.

Other uses
The stadium also hosts important athletic events. It has hosted the SAF Games in 1987 and various national athletics events in India. The stadium also hosts different kinds of cultural programs such as dance and music concerts. The stadium also hosted the opening ceremony of 2013 IPL Season.

Gallery

See also
 List of football stadiums in India
 List of association football stadiums by capacity
 List of Asian stadiums by capacity

References

External links

 Vivekananda Yuba Bharati Krirangan (VYBK), Kolkata – FIFA
 Salt Lake Stadium, Kolkata  – overview at indiansuperleague.com
 Vivekananda Yuba Bharati Krirangan at Playmaker Stats 

Sports venues in Kolkata
Football venues in West Bengal
India
Athletics (track and field) venues in India
Mohun Bagan AC
Mohammedan SC (Kolkata)
East Bengal Club
Indian Super League stadiums
ATK (football club)
2017 FIFA U-17 World Cup venues
1984 establishments in West Bengal
Sports venues completed in 1984
20th-century architecture in India